The British Aerospace Jetstream 41 is a turboprop-powered feederliner and regional airliner, designed by British Aerospace as a stretched version of the popular Jetstream 31. Intended to compete directly with 30-seat aircraft like the Embraer Brasilia, Dornier 328 and Saab 340, the new design eventually accommodated 29 passengers in a two-by-one arrangement like the Jetstream 31. Eastern Airways of the UK is the biggest operator of Jetstream 41s in the world, with 14 in the fleet.

Design and development
The Jetstream 41's stretch added  to the fuselage, consisting of an  plug forward of the wing and a  plug to the rear; the fuselage design was all-new with no commonality with the old fuselage. The wing had increased span and redesigned ailerons and flaps. It was mounted below the fuselage, so the spar did not form a step in the cabin aisle. This also gave more baggage capacity in larger wing-root fairings.

The Allied Signal TPE331-14 engines deliver 1,500 shp (1,120 kW), (later 1,650 shp (1,232 kW)), and are mounted in nacelles with increased ground clearance. The flightdeck is improved with a modern EFIS setup, and a new windscreen arrangement. The J41 was the first turboprop certified to both JAR25 and FAR25 standards.

Operational history

The J41 flew for the first time on 25 September 1991 and was certified on 23 November 1992 in Europe, and 9 April 1993 in the United States, with the first delivery, to Manx Airlines on 25 November 1992. In January 1996, the J41 became part of the Aero International (Regional) (AI(R)), a marketing consortium consisting of ATR, Aérospatiale (of France), Alenia (of Italy), and British Aerospace. Sales initially were fairly strong, but in May 1997 BAe announced that it was terminating J41 production, with 100 aircraft delivered.

Operators
As of July 2018, 51 aircraft remain in active commercial service.

Civil operators

 Sky Express (1)

Sky High Aviation Services (2)

 Yeti Airlines (6)
 Guna Airlines (5)

 Airlink (8)

 Eastern Airways (14)

 Contour Airlines (4)
Operated by Corporate Flight Management

 Proflight Zambia (3)

Other operators include:

 Royal Star Aviation (1)
 Air Republiq Airlines (1)

Former Civil operators

 Brindabella Airlines

 Air Atlantic

 EasyFly (Colombia) (10)

 Hong Kong Government Flying Service – (2) for search-and-rescue.

 Moçambique Expresso (1)

 Agni Air (3)

 Origin Pacific Airways (5)

Eastern SkyJets (1)

Loganair (3)

 Trans States Airlines (25) – aircraft operated as American Connection, Delta Connection and Trans World Express providing passenger feed service on behalf of respective major air carrier partners American Airlines, Delta Air Lines and Trans World Airlines (TWA).
 Atlantic Coast Airlines – aircraft operated as United Express providing passenger feed service on behalf of major air carrier partner United Airlines.

 Delbitur (1)

Venezolana (9)

Military operators

 Royal Thai Army

Preservation
The prototype Jetstream 41 G-JMAC is preserved by the Speke Aerodrome Heritage Group (SAHG) on the former airside apron behind the Crowne Plaza Liverpool John Lennon Airport Hotel, which was the original terminal building of Liverpool Speke Airport.

Accidents and incidents
 On 7 January 1994, United Express Flight 6291 crashed short of the runway at Port Columbus International Airport, killing five people out of eight passengers and crew.
 On 24 September 2009, Airlink Flight 8911 crashed in the suburb of Merebank in Durban, South Africa, shortly after takeoff from Durban International Airport. The crew of three and one person on the ground was injured. The captain, Allister Freeman, died as a result of complications from his injuries on 7 October 2009.
 On 24 September 2016, A Yeti Airlines flight registration 9N-AIB en route from Kathmandu to Bhairahawa overran the runway while landing at Gautam Buddha Airport. All 29 passengers and the crew of 3 were unhurt but the aircraft was damaged beyond repair.

Specifications (Jetstream 41)

See also

References

Bibliography

 Lambert, Mark. Jane's All The World's Aircraft 1993–94. Coulsden, UK:Jane's Data Division, 1993. .
 O'Toole, Kevin. "Prestwick seeks new work after J41 closure". Flight International, 4–10 October 1997, p. 4.
 Swanborough, Gordon. "Jetstream Jubilee". Air International, August 1991, Vol 41 No 2, pp. 73–79. Stamford, UK:Key Publishing. ISSN 0306-5634.
 Taylor, Michael, ed. Brassey's World Aircraft & Systems Directory 1996/97. London: Brassey's, 1996. .
 Wilson, Stewart. Airliners of the World. Fyshwick, Australia: Aerospace Publications Pty Ltd., 1999. .

External links

 BAE Systems history
 Airliners.net BAE Jetstream 41
 

1990s British airliners
Jetstream 41
Twin-turboprop tractor aircraft
Cruciform tail aircraft
Aircraft first flown in 1991
Low-wing aircraft